Pusan Newport International Terminal (PNIT) is a new port constructed in Busan, in South Korea; it is a joint venture between PSA International and Hanjin.

The port has three deepwater berths, 1.2 km of quay, and a capacity of 2 million TEU; it opened in March 2010.

The port is positioning itself as a trans-pacific transshipment hub.

See also
 Busan Port Authority

References

Busan
Ports and harbours of South Korea